Hesperilla is a genus of skipper butterflies in the family Hesperiidae.

Species
The genus includes the following species:

 Hesperilla ornata Leach, 1814
 Hesperilla picta Leach, 1814
 Hesperilla crypsargyra Meyrick, 1888
 Hesperilla chrysotricha Meyrick & Lower, 1902
 Hesperilla sexguttata Herrich-Schäffer, 1869
 Hesperilla furva Sands & Kerr, 1973
 Hesperilla crypsigramma Meyrick & Lower, 1902
 Hesperilla sarnia Atkins, 1978
 Hesperilla malindeva Lower, 1911
 Hesperilla mastersi Waterhouse, 1900
 Hesperilla idothea Miskin, 1889
 Hesperilla flavescens Waterhouse, 1927
 Hesperilla donnysa Hewitson, 1868

Former species
Hesperilla saxula Mabille, 1891 - synonymized with Halotus angellus Plötz, 1886

References
 Natural History Museum Lepidoptera genus database
 Hesperilla at funet

Trapezitinae
Hesperiidae genera